Tropiphorus terricola is a species of broad-nosed weevil in the beetle family Curculionidae. It has a broad distribution through northern Europe, and has been introduced into North America.

References

Further reading

External links

 

Entiminae
Articles created by Qbugbot
Beetles described in 1838